Eluned Phillips (27 October 1914 – 10 January 2009) was the only woman to win the bardic crown at the National Eisteddfod of Wales twice, a feat she accomplished in 1967 at Bala and 1983 at Llangefni.

Phillips was born in Cenarth, on the same day that Dylan Thomas was born in Swansea. She knew Thomas well, but did not number him among her close friends. Her friends included Augustus John and Edith Piaf. It has been said that Pablo Picasso showed her the original of "Guernica" shortly after he completed it.

She died of pneumonia, aged 94, at Glangwili Hospital in Carmarthen. At the time of her death she was the oldest member of the Gorsedd of Bards.

Works
Dewi Emrys (1971)
Cerddi Glyn-y-Mêl (1985)
The Reluctant Redhead (2007) (memoirs)

References

1914 births
2009 deaths
Bards of the Gorsedd
Crowned bards
Deaths from pneumonia in Wales
Welsh-language poets
20th-century Welsh poets